Deh Bar or Dehbar ( or ) may refer to:
 Deh Bar, Razavi Khorasan